Miss Seventeen is a reality television show on MTV that aired from October 17, 2005 to December 19, 2005. Atoosa Rubenstein was the main judge, she was the youngest editor-in-chief ever to run Seventeen magazine. They picked 17 girls from around the United States who were not only photogenic but also had been at the top of their class, to provide a role model for young women. The girls were flown to New York, where they would take part in a contest similar in format to The Apprentice — they would be given tasks to be done by Atoosa, and in each episode one of the girls would be eliminated from the competition. The winner would get her face on the cover of Seventeen magazine, a college scholarship and would be offered an internship job on the magazine.

The criteria for elimination were not only performing poorly — Atoosa was watchful of how the girls talked when no one else was in the room, via cameras set up around the house.  In this manner, she could watch the girls with their guards down and see what their real motivations and dreams were. In one elimination, for example, Atoosa sat down with the girl and explained that she didn't feel that the girl was in the contest for the 'right' reasons — video clips were shown to the viewers which showed the girl talking to her other roommates and explaining that she was more interested in the face-time she would get for being part of an MTV show.

Where the format differed from other shows was in the first elimination round and in how the contestants found out who was eliminated. In the first episode, all 17 girls sat around the dinner table with Atoosa and had to describe in brief who they were and what they hoped they would get out of the experience. Based on this conversation, Atoosa eliminated 7 of the girls from the contest. The way the girls would generally find out who was eliminated was by sitting around a TV as Atoosa would talk to them, telling them the results of the tasks they were given. The TV screen would then display the names of the girls who would be staying in the house, written in cursive form. The girl whose name didn't appear on 'The List' was eliminated, and met with Atoosa to hear her reasoning for why she was eliminated.

In the final episode, Jennifer Steele was declared the winner, with her magazine cover unveiled in Times Square. It was also revealed that Brianne Burrowes, who voluntarily left the show in an early episode of the series, was offered a job by Atoosa and will be working with Jennifer in their respective internships at the magazine.

References

MTV original programming
2005 American television series debuts
2005 American television series endings
2000s American reality television series
Women in New York City